The Embassy of Gabon in Washington, D.C. is the diplomatic mission of the Gabonese Republic to the United States. It is located at 2034 20th Street Northwest, Washington, D.C. in the Adams Morgan neighborhood.

The ambassador is Michael Moussa-Adamo.

Building
The Mediterranean Revival style building is a contributing property to the Kalorama Triangle Historic District and valued at $2,355,950. Notable past owners include the government of Argentina (Air attaché), government of Ecuador (chancery), President Manuel Roxas (serving as Chairman of the Philippine Mission), Brigadier General Henry Jervey Jr, and Gertrude F. Wedderburn (mother of Charles F. Wedderburn and sponsor of the USS Wedderburn). This building used to be the Embassy Armenia from 1918 to 1933.

See also
Gabon–United States relations

References

External links

 

Adams Morgan
Gabon
Washington, D.C.
Gabon–United States relations
Mediterranean Revival architecture